Separation Range is the Commonwealth Range branches at about 8420S and forms two chains of mountains separated by Hood Glacier. The Separation Range, about 30 nautical miles (60 km) long, is the eastern branch and terminates to the north at Ross Ice Shelf. Named by the New Zealand Alpine Club Antarctic Expedition, 1959–60.

Mountain ranges
Mountain ranges of Antarctica
Dufek Coast